Jason Graves is an American television, film, and video game music composer. His works include the musical scores for Dead Space, Alpha Protocol, Tomb Raider, The Order: 1886, Until Dawn, Evolve, Dungeon Siege, and Far Cry Primal.

Video games

References

External links

 
 Jason Graves on Twitter
 

21st-century American composers
American male composers
Place of birth missing (living people)
American music arrangers
Living people
Video game composers
Year of birth missing (living people)
21st-century American male musicians